North Spirit Lake First Nation (Oji-Cree: ᒣᒣᑴᔑ ᓴᑲᐦᐃᑲᐣ) is a small Oji-Cree First Nation reserve in Northern Ontario, located north of Red Lake, Ontario. It is connected to Sandy Lake First Nation, and Deer Lake First Nation by winter/ice roads.  It is part of the Keewaytinook Okimakanak Council (Northern Chiefs) and the Nishnawbe Aski Nation.

North Spirit Lake is policed by the Nishnawbe-Aski Police Service, an Aboriginal-based service.

References

Communities in Kenora District
Nishnawbe Aski Nation
Oji-Cree reserves in Ontario
Road-inaccessible communities of Ontario